Rebecca S. Dresser (born 5 April 1952) is an American legal scholar and medical ethicist.

Dresser earned a bachelor of arts degree in psychology and sociology at Indiana University Bloomington in 1973, followed by a master's of science in education at the same institution in 1975. She then graduated from Harvard Law School in 1979. She began teaching at the Washington University in St. Louis in 1983, was appointed Daniel Noyes Kirby Professor of Law, and granted emeritus status upon retirement. Between 1992 and 1993, Dresser returned to Harvard as faculty fellow of the Safra Center for Ethics.

She was diagnosed with cancer of the head and neck in 2006.

Selected publications

References

American legal scholars
Indiana University Bloomington alumni
Harvard Law School alumni
Living people
Washington University in St. Louis faculty
American ethicists
Medical ethicists
American women legal scholars
1952 births